Manta Cars was owned and operated by American brothers Brad and Tim LoVette, and was located in Costa Mesa, California, from 1974 to 1986 (Manta Cars moved their production facility and showroom to 2914 Halladay Avenue, Santa Ana, California around 1980).  Manta produced the Manta Mirage, and later produced other component kit cars, including the rear-engined Volkswagen Beetle-based Manta Montage, and the mid-engined Montage-T, which had a custom space frame chassis and used GM X-body V6 drivetrains. The Montage-T recreated the elusive McLaren M6GT.

A very accurate reproduction of the classic 1953 Corvette was to be added to their product line, and although a prototype was built, Manta Cars ceased production in 1986, having sold about 1,000 factory-built and component cars.
The Manta Mirage was an American mid-engined vehicle produced by Manta Cars. The Mirage, originally referred to as just the "Manta", or the "Manta Can-Am", was a lightweight, road-legal racing car. The Mirage's steel space frame chassis was fitted with a high-output V8 engine and four-speed transaxle. The original Mirage design mated the Chevy V8 to a Corvair transaxle via a Kelmark adapter and remote shifter. The bodywork was all hand-laid fiberglass, colored in a range of gel-coat colors. Gull-wing doors were fitted to a removable top section, while the doors flip forward for entry.

Media appearances
The Mirage was one of the 48 cars stolen in the original 1974 movie version of Gone In 60 Seconds, directed by H.B. Halicki. One can also be seen in Halicki's 1983 film Deadline Auto Theft.

A Manta Montage, modified by George Barris, was the car in the first season of the 1983 TV show Hardcastle and McCormick (disputed in the Hardcastle and McCormick article).  A Montage also appeared in the 1991 movie Highway To Hell. A Manta Mirage is modified in the History Channels Counting Cars episode "Red, Hot and Dangerous".

Note: Manta Mirages do not appear in the 1975 movie Death Race 2000. These cars were a basic Canam style built on a VW pan, and were built by  Dick Dean.

References
 
 

Grand tourers
Rear mid-engine, rear-wheel-drive vehicles
Coupés
Cars introduced in 1974
Automobiles with gull-wing doors
Cars of the United States